Statistics of Qatar Stars League for the 1982–83 season.

Overview
Al-Arabi Sports Club won the championship.

References
Qatar - List of final tables (RSSSF)

1982–83 in Asian association football leagues
1982–83 in Qatari football